{{DISPLAYTITLE:C6H8O7}}
The molecular formula C6H8O7 (molar mass: 192.12 g/mol, exact mass: 192.0270 u) may refer to:

 Citric acid
 Isocitric acid

Molecular formulas